Poryvistyy ("Impetuous") was a Project 1135 Burevestnik Guard Ship (SKR) or Krivak-class frigate. Displacing  full load, the vessel was armed with the Rastrub-B anti-submarine and anti-shipping missile system. Launched on 16 May 1981, the vessel joined the Pacific Fleet of the Soviet Navy. Over the next decade, exercises with the aircraft carrier  and other members of the Soviet fleet took the ship to Hawaii to demonstrate the capacity of the country to field a blue water navy. Later, the escalating Iran–Iraq War led to the ship being transferred to escorting duties in the Persian Gulf. Between 1987 and 1988, Poryvistyy successfully accompanied 67 merchant ships to safety. After the dissolution of the Soviet Union in 1991, the ship was transferred to the Russian Navy, but, during the following year, was placed in reserve. Decommissioned on 5 June 1994, the ship was sold to a sea club named Vostok to serve as a museum ship. It served in this role until it was damaged by a fire in 1997.

Design and development
Designed by N.P. Sobolov, Poryvistyy was the twenty-first and final Project 1135 Guard Ship (SKR) launched. The vessel is named for a Russian word which can be translated impetuous.  Poryvistyy served with the Soviet Navy, and the Russian Navy after the dissolution of the Soviet Union, as an anti-submarine frigate. The ship was designed to create safe areas for friendly ballistic missile submarines close to the coast.

Poryvistyy displaced  standard and  full load. The ship's complement was 192, including 23 officers.

The ship was designed around a main armament of four URPK-5 Rastrub B missiles (NATO reporting name SS-N-14B ‘’Silex’') mounted on the foredeck, which provided both anti-submarine and anti-shipping capability. The missiles were backed up by a pair of quadruple  torpedo tubes and a pair of RBU-6000  Smerch-2 anti-submarine rocket launchers. Defence against aircraft was provided by forty 4K33 OSA-MA (SA-N-4 Gecko) surface to air missiles which were launched from two twin ZIF-122 launchers, one mounted forward and the other aft. Two twin  AK-726 guns were mounted aft. Mines were also carried, either eighteen IGDM-500 KSM, fourteen KAM, fourteen KB Krab, ten Serpey, four PMR-1, seven PMR-2, seven MTPK-1, fourteen RM-1 or twelve UDM-2.

The ship had a well-equipped sensor suite, including a single MR-310A Angara-A air/surface search radar, Volga navigation radar, Don navigation radar, MP-401S Start-S ESM radar system, Nickel-KM and Kremniyy IFF and ARP-50R radio direction finder. An extensive sonar complement was fitted, including MG-332 Titan-2, MG-325 Vega and MGS-400K, along with two MG-7 Braslet anti-saboteur sonars and the MG-26 Hosta underwater communication system. The ship was also fitted with the PK-16 ship-borne decoy dispenser system.

Construction and career
Poryvistyy was laid down by Zalyv Shipbuilding yard in Kerch on 21 May 1980, the last of the class to be constructed by the shipbuilder, and was given the yard number 17. Launched on 16 May 1981 and commissioned on 29 December, having already been allocated to the Pacific Fleet on 9 February. To that end, on 17 October 1983, Poryvistyy left Sevastopol with the aircraft carrier  and sailed to Vladivostok, arriving on 28 February the following year. En route, the vessels called at Luanda, Angola, between 12 and 20 November, Maputo, Mozambique, between 1 and 9 December, Victoria, Seychelles, between 8 and 13 December and Madras, India, between 5 and 10 February. The vessel became part of the 173rd Brigade.

1985 saw Poryvistyy take part in a number of exercises in the Pacific Ocean with Novorossiysk. Soon afterwards, between 29 May and 16 June, the pair were again together in the Sea of Japan undertaking anti-submarine drills. Later that year, between 13 and 18 August, the vessel accompanied Tallinn on a diplomatic mission to North Korea. The breadth of these operations were designed to demonstrate the Soviet ability to operate as a blue-water navy.

On 6 May 1987, a Soviet tanker was attacked by gunboats of the Islamic Republic of Iran Navy, part of an escalation in the Iran–Iraq War that had been raging since 22 September 1980. The Soviet Union responded by sending a large naval force, including Poryvistyy, which had at the time just finished a visit to Colombo, Sri Lanka, to the Persian Gulf to escort merchant vessels. Operations continued into the following year, with a total of 67 merchant ships taken under the ship's umbrella and safely brought to port. The ship then returned to the Sea of Japan, revisiting North Korea between 14 and 18 August 1990.

With the dissolution of the Soviet Union on 26 December 1991, the ship was transferred to the Russian Navy. The vessel was deemed superfluous to requirements and, on 8 May 1992, was placed in reserve, being decommissioned two years later on 5 June 1994. However, the ship was still in a good condition and so was sold to a sea club named Vostok on 25 November. Poryvistyy served as a museum ship until being damaged by fire on 20 March 1997.

Selected Pennant numbers

References

Citations

Bibliography
 
 
 
 
 
 
 

1981 ships
Krivak-class frigates
Ships built at the Zalyv Shipbuilding yard
Ships built in the Soviet Union
Cold War frigates of the Soviet Union